Senator Cox may refer to:

Dave Cox (1938–2010), California State Senate
Eugene Saint Julien Cox (1834–1898), Minnesota State Senate
Hardin Cox (1928–2013), Missouri State Senate
Jacob Dolson Cox (1828–1900), Ohio State Senate
James H. Cox (Virginian) (1810–1877), Virginia State Senate
John I. Cox (1855–1946), Tennessee State Senate
Kenneth Cox (born 1928), Ohio State Senate
Noel Cox (politician) (1911–1985), Missouri State Senate
Thomas Cox (politician) (1787–1844), Illinois State Senate
William Hopkinson Cox (1856–1950), Kentucky State Senate

See also
Eckley Brinton Coxe (1839–1895), Pennsylvania State Senate
Tiny Kox (born 1953), Senate of the Netherlands